"There Will Be a Day" is the lead single by CCM musician Jeremy Camp from his fifth studio album, Speaking Louder Than Before. It was released to radio in mid-September 2008 and as a digital download on September 23, 2008.

The song was included on the compilation album WOW Hits 2010, and a live version is available on the 2009 album Jeremy Camp Live.

Charts
After being released in September 2008, "There Will Be a Day" became a number-one hit on R&R's Christian CHR chart in early December. It stayed at the top position for nine consecutive weeks. During January 2009, it stayed at number one for three weeks on the Christian AC chart.

Year-end charts

Decade-end charts

Certifications

References

2008 singles
Jeremy Camp songs
2008 songs
Songs written by Jeremy Camp